Partners in Crime may refer to:

Literature
 Partners in Crime (short story collection), a 1929 collection of mystery stories by Agatha Christie
 Partners in Crime (Hinojosa novel), a 1985 novel by Rolando Hinojosa
 Partners in Crime (Hinton novel), a 2003 novel by Nigel Hinton

Music
 Partners in Crime, a 1978 album by Bandit
 Partners in Crime (album), a 1979 album by Rupert Holmes
 "Partners in Crime", song by Mr. Mister from their debut album I Wear the Face, recorded in 1983
 Partners in Kryme, an American rap duo, formed in 1990
 "Partners in Crime" (song), performed at the 2007 Eurovision Song Contest
 "Partners in Crime", a 2012 song by The Strokes from their album Comedown Machine
 "Partners in Crime", a song by Roger McGuinn and Jacques Levy from  McGuinn's 1976 album Cardiff Rose
 "Partners in Crime", a 2012 song by Set it Off featuring Ashley Costello

Film
 Partners in Crime (1928 film), an American silent film
 Partners in Crime (1937 film), an American film
 Partners in Crime (1942 film), a British film
 Partners in Crime (1961 film), one of the Edgar Wallace Mysteries series
 Partners in Crime (1973 film), an American TV movie
 Partners in Crime (2012 film), a French movie
 Partners in Crime (2014 film), a Taiwanese film
 Partners in Crime (2022 film), a Filipino film

Television
 Agatha Christie's Partners in Crime, a 1983 TV series based on the short story collection
 Partners in Crime (American TV series), a 1984 detective series starring Lynda Carter and Loni Anderson
 Partners in Crime (UK TV series), a 2015 television series based on Agatha Christie's novels
 "Partners in Crime" (Doctor Who), a 2008 episode of Doctor Who

Radio
 Partners in Crime (radio series), 1953